, better known as Royal Kobayashi, is a retired Japanese boxer who competed at the 1972 Munich Olympic Games in the featherweight division, and won the Lineal and WBC junior featherweight titles in 1976. He is an alumnus of the Takushoku University.

Amateur career
Kobayashi who had practiced kendo until high school graduation, began boxing after admission to the Physical Training School of the Self Defense Forces. He won the All-Japan Amateur Boxing Championships in the featherweight division in 1971 and 1972.

Kobayashi represented Japan at the 1972 Summer Olympics in Munich. In the second round match against Pat Ryan, Kobayashi knocked him down thrice, badly damaged his face, and won by a 4–1 decision. Beaver County Times called the one vote against Kobayashi "the most ridiculous decision (vote) of the night". Kobayashi then knocked out Italy's Pasqualino Morbidelli in one round, before losing 1–4 to András Botos in the quarterfinals. He compiled an amateur record of 34–3 (28 KOs) before turning professional.

Professional career
Since Kobayashi was an amateur boxer, he was said to be suitable for professional for his hard punches. In 1973, Kobayashi ran into Yoshinori Takahashi who is the president of Kokusai Boxing Sports Gym established in Tokyo in 1971 at a sports massage clinic, and was encouraged to turn professional.
 
Kobayashi made his professional debut under the ring name Royal Kobayashi in an eight-round bout in February 1973. His first world title shot against WBA featherweight champion Alexis Argüello ended in a fifth round knockout loss, in front of 16,000 spectators at the Kuramae Kokugikan in Tokyo in October 1975. After the fight, Kobayashi stated that he felt as if he had been beaten with a chunk of ice. In February 1976, he made an expedition to Panama, and lost on points there.

On October 9, 1976, Kobayashi moved down a weight class and dethroned Rigoberto Riasco as the WBC and lineal junior featherweight champion while being watched by 9,000 spectators at the Kuramae Kokugikan. He floored Riasco once with his left hook in the seventh round, and twice with his right hooks in the eighth round. However, he lost the title in his first defense against Dong-Kyun Yum via a majority decision at the Jangchung Gymnasium in Seoul, South Korea, on November 24 of that year. In January 1978, Kobayashi challenged Wilfredo Gómez to regain the WBC junior featherweight title in front of 10,000 spectators at the Kitakyūshū Municipal Gymnasium in Fukuoka, but was knocked out in the third round.

Kobayashi went back to the featherweight division, and captured the OPBF title in April 1978. After defending that title once, he fought against Eusebio Pedroza for the WBA featherweight title at the Korakuen Hall in January 1979. However he quit after thirteen rounds with his face swollen by a barrage of blows in the eighth round. Kobayashi defended the OPBF title seven times in total, for about two and a half years. In his eighth defense in October 1981, he suffered a first round knockout loss and retired as a boxer. His manager Takahashi later told that he realized the importance of short punches when Kobayashi lost to Pedroza and when he brought up Leopard Tamakuma to be a world champion he taught it to him thoroughly.

See also
List of super-bantamweight boxing champions
List of WBC world champions
List of WBC world champions
List of Japanese boxing world champions
Boxing in Japan

References

Bibliography

External links

Royal Kobayashi - CBZ Profile

|-

World Boxing Council champions
World super-bantamweight boxing champions
World boxing champions
Olympic boxers of Japan
Sportspeople from Kumamoto Prefecture
1949 births
Living people
Boxers at the 1972 Summer Olympics
Japan Ground Self-Defense Force personnel
Japanese male boxers